Trudeau is a surname that is used primarily in the Canadian province of Quebec.

Trudeau may also refer to:

Montréal–Pierre Elliott Trudeau International Airport, in Montreal
Trudeau Landing, an archaeological site in Louisiana
Mount Pierre Elliott Trudeau, a mountain in British Columbia
Trudeau Sanitorium, former New York tuberculosis sanitorium
Trudeau Institute, a biomedical institute in New York
Pierre Elliott Trudeau Foundation, a Canadian charity
Trudeau Corporation, a North American housewares and kitchenwares company
Trudeau (film), a 2002 television miniseries on Pierre Trudeau

See also

 Trudeaumania, the nickname given in early 1968 to the excitement generated by Pierre Trudeau
 Pierre Elliott Trudeau (disambiguation)
 
 Truteau (surname)

ru:Трюдо